USS Weepoose (SP-405) was a United States Navy patrol vessel in commission from 1917 to ca. 1918–1920.

Weepoose was built as a private motorboat of the same name in 1911 by the Salisbury Marine Construction Company at Salisbury, Maryland. On 2 July 1917, the U.S. Navy acquired her from her owner, C. S. Thorne, for use as a section patrol vessel during World War I. She was commissioned as USS Weepoose (SP-405) on 22 October 1917.

Assigned to the 3rd Naval District, Weepoose carried out submarine net patrols, but little else is known of her naval career. It is known that on 1 February 1918 she was based at Rosebank, Staten Island, New York.

Weepoose was transferred to the United States Department of Agriculture on 28 September 1920.

References

Department of the Navy Naval History and Heritage Command Online Library of Selected Images: Civilian Ships: Weepoose (American Motor Boat, 1911). Served as the USS Weepoose (SP-405) in 1917-1920
NavSource Online: Section Patrol Craft Photo Archive: Weepoose (SP 405)

Patrol vessels of the United States Navy
World War I patrol vessels of the United States
Ships built in Salisbury, Maryland
1911 ships